Antonia Herrero (c. 27 November 1897 – 11 April 1978) was an Argentine film actress born in Spain.

She began acting in theater at Spain and moved to Argentina where she acted in the Argentine cinema between 1944 and 1973. Antonia Herrero was the mother of comedian Marisa Herrero.

Selected filmography 
 The Black Crown (1951)
 El hombre señalado (1957)

External links 
 

1975 deaths
Argentine film actresses
1897 births

Spanish emigrants to Argentina